The Europe/Africa Zone is one of three zones of regional competition in the 2020–21 Billie Jean King Cup.

Group I 
 Venue 1: Tallink Tennis Center, Tallinn, Estonia (indoor hard)
 Venue 2: Centre National de Tennis, Esch-sur-Alzette, Luxembourg (indoor hard)
 Date: 5–8 February 2020

The thirteen teams were split across the two venues, with 7 teams competing in Tallinn and the other 6 competing in Esch-sur-Alzette. In Tallinn, the seven teams were split into two Pools of three and four teams with the teams finishing 1st and 2nd place in the pool competing in promotional playoffs for advancement to the play-offs. In Esch-sur-Alzette, the nations were split into two pools of 3 teams, with the nations finishing first and second competing in promotional playoffs for advancement to the play-offs. The nations finishing last in the each of the pools competed in relegation playoffs, with one nation from each venue relegated to Group II in 2022.

Seeding

 1Billie Jean King Cup Rankings as of 11 November 2019

Pools

Play-offs

Final placements 

Group II 
 Venue: Tali Tennis Center, Helsinki, Finland (indoor hard) 
 Dates: 4–7 February 2020

The eight teams are split into two pools of 4. The 1st and 2nd placed teams of each pool will play-off to determine the nation advancing to Group I in 2022. The third and fourth placed teams will play-off to determine the nations relegated to Group III in 2022.

Seeding

 1Billie Jean King Cup Rankings as of 11 November 2019

Pools

Play-offs

Final placements 

Group III 
 Venue: SEB Arena, Vilnius, Lithuania (indoor hard) 
 Dates: 15–19 June 2021

The 21 teams are split into three pools of 4 teams and three pools of 3 teams. The 1st placed teams of each pool will play-off to determine the two nations advancing to Group II in 2022.

Seeding

 1Billie Jean King Cup Rankings as of 19 April 2021

Pools

Play-offs

Promotional play-offs

5th-place play-off

7th-12th-place play-offs

11th-place play-off

13th-18th-place play-offs

17th-place play-off

19th-21st-place play-offs

Final placements 

References

External links 
 Billie Jean King Cup website
 Billie Jean King Cup Result, 2020 Europe/Africa Group I
 Billie Jean King Cup Result, 2020 Europe/Africa Group II
 Billie Jean King Cup Result, 2020 Europe/Africa Group III

 
Europe Africa
Tennis tournaments in Estonia
Tennis tournaments in Luxembourg
Tennis tournaments in Finland
Tennis tournaments in Lithuania
Billie Jean King Cup Europe Africa Zone
Billie Jean King Cup Europe Africa Zone